Centroberyx rubricaudus is a member of the family Berycidae. Originally thought to be endemic to Taiwan, there has been a reported catch of C. rubricaudus at the Andaman Islands in the Indian Ocean.

References

External links
 

Berycidae
Fish described in 1985
Fish of the Indian Ocean
Fish of the Pacific Ocean
Fish of Taiwan